Caldwell is a city in and the county seat of Burleson County, Texas, United States. The population was 3,993 at the 2020 census. It is part of the Bryan-College Station metropolitan area.

Geography

Caldwell is located northwest of the center of Burleson County at  (30.528580, –96.700350). Texas State Highway 21 passes through the center of the city, leading northeast  to Bryan and southwest  to Bastrop. Texas State Highway 36 bypasses the center of the city to the northeast, leading northwest  to Milano and southeast  to Brenham.

Demographics

As of the 2020 United States census, there were 3,993 people, 1,694 households, and 896 families residing in the city.

As of the census of 2000, there were 3,449 people, 1,322 households, and 938 families residing in the city. The population density was 1,021.4 people per square mile (394.0/km2). There were 1,485 housing units at an average density of 439.8 per square mile (169.6/km2). The racial makeup of the city was 71.24% White, 12.64% African American, 0.17% Native American, 0.09% Asian, 13.71% from other races, and 2.15% from two or more races. Hispanic or Latino of any race were 22.96% of the population.

There were 1,322 households, out of which 36.5% had children under the age of 18 living with them, 52.5% were married couples living together, 14.1% had a female householder with no husband present, and 29.0% were non-families. 26.3% of all households were made up of individuals, and 15.8% had someone living alone who was 65 years of age or older. The average household size was 2.61 and the average family size was 3.16.

In the city, the population was spread out, with 28.8% under the age of 18, 9.5% from 18 to 24, 26.7% from 25 to 44, 20.5% from 45 to 64, and 14.5% who were 65 years of age or older. The median age was 34 years. For every 100 females, there were 87.0 males. For every 100 females age 18 and over, there were 83.2 males.

The median income for a household in the city was $29,936, and the median income for a family was $37,658. Males had a median income of $25,745 versus $20,306 for females. The per capita income for the city was $14,141. About 14.2% of families and 17.9% of the population were below the poverty line, including 21.0% of those under age 18 and 12.2% of those age 65 or over.

Education
Caldwell is served by the Caldwell Independent School District.

Photo gallery

Notable people

 Mel Deutsch, former Major League Baseball player
 Alfred Jackson, former NFL Football player
 Charlie Krueger, former NFL Football player

Climate
The climate in this area is characterized by hot, humid summers and generally mild to cool winters.  According to the Köppen Climate Classification system, Caldwell has a humid subtropical climate, abbreviated "Cfa" on climate maps.

References

External links

City of Caldwell official website

Cities in Texas
Czech-American culture in Texas
Cities in Burleson County, Texas
County seats in Texas
Bryan–College Station